Amarna letter EA 245, titled: "Assignment of Guilt," is a medium length clay tablet Amarna letter from Biridiya the governor-'mayor' of Magidda. It is letter number four of five from Biridiya.

The letter is in pristine condition except for a missing flake (lower-right, obverse) causing a lacuna at the end of a few lines. The cuneiform characters are finely inscribed, with some photos that can even show the individual strokes of the cuneiform characters (the stroke sequence). The letter is 47-lines long, and about 5-in tall. Letter EA 245 (see here-(Obverse)), is numbered BM 29855, at the British Museum.

The Amarna letters, about 300, numbered up to EA 382, are a mid 14th century BC, about 1350 BC and 20–25 years later, correspondence. The initial corpus of letters were found at Akhenaten's city Akhetaten, in the floor of the Bureau of Correspondence of Pharaoh; others were later found, adding to the body of letters.

The letter

EA 245: "Assignment of Guilt"
EA 245, letter four of five. (Not a linear, line-by-line translation, and English from French.)

(Obverse, see here )
(Lines 1-7)--Moreover,1 I urged my brothers, "If the god of the king, our lord, brings it about2 that we overcome Lab'ayu, then we must bring him alive :–(gloss) ha-ia-ma to the king, our lord."
(8-14)--My mare, however having been put out of action :–-(gloss) tu-ra (having been shot), I took my place behind him :–(gloss) ah-ru-un-ú and rode with Yashdata.3 But before my arrival they had struck him down :–(gloss) ma-ah-ṣú-ú.
(15-23)--Yašdata being truly your servant, he it was that entered with me into batt[le]. May [ ... ] [ ... ] the life4 of the king, my [lord], that he may br[ing peace to ever]yone5 in [the lands of] the king, [my] lord.
(Reverse, see here )
(24-35)--It had been Surata that took Labaya from Magidda. and said to me, "I will send him to the king by boat :–(gloss) a-na-yi "6 Surata took him, but he sent him from Hinnatunu to his home, for it was Surata that had accepted from him :–(gloss) ba-di-ú his ransom.
(36-47)--Moreover, what have I done to the king, my lord, that he has treated me with contempt :–(gloss) ia8-qí-ìl-li-ni and honored :–(gloss) ia8-ka-bi-id my less important brothers?7 It was Surata that let Lab'ayu go, and it was Surata that let Ba'l-mehir go, (both) to their homes. And may the king, my lord, know.--(complete Obverse & Reverse, EA 245, minor, restored lacunae, (and a small corner of clay tablet missing), total ines 1-47)

Akkadian text
The Akkadian language text:

Akkadian:

Obverse

(Line 1)--Ša-ni-tam dabābu--(..Furthermore,.. to expound upon (to talk))
(2)--UGU ŜEŠ-HI.A-ia--(upon Brothers-Mine,.. )
(3)--šumma epēšu--(..If .. to make happen)
(4)--DMEŠ-nu ša LUGAL-ri(=ŠÀRru) ENBēlu-nu--( "the God"-ours,.. 'which of' King-Lord-Ours.. )
(5)--ù kašādu--(..and Defeat–!.. )
(6)--1.diš-La-aB-A-iYa ù til-la-nu-um-ma :-(gloss) ha-ia-ma--(1.diš-Labaya,.. and "bodily" : (–gl–) "alive",.. )
(7)--nu-abālu ana LUGAL-ri(=ŠÀRru) ENBēlu-nu--(..Bring 'unto'(to) King-Lord-Ours–!... )
segue:
(8)--Ù tu-sà-ah-mi(=tazzimtu) : (–gl–) tu-ra(tarû)--(..But "bad luck" :-(gloss) "returned"?('my horse was "shot"')..)
(9)--ANŠE.KUR.ra :-(gloss) MUNUS-ia ù uzuzzu--(Horse- :-(gloss) mine,..and "to be present",.. )
(10)--EGIR.ERIM-šu : (–gl–) harānnú--(..BEHIND.ARMY-his :-(gloss) "expeditioning"(=road, journey) )
(11)--ù erēbu--(..and "to encamp"(to set),.. )
(12)--itti 1.diš-Ya((=pi))-aŠ-Da-Ta--(with Yashdata–!... )
segue:
(13)--Ù adi kašādu--(..But before "conquering"(reaching/vanquishing),.. )
(14)--ù dâku :-(gloss) mahāṣ(ú)u--(and "killed" : (–gl–) 'fighting'–!.. )
(15)--ù elû-mì(+šamû(heaven)?) 1.diš-Ya(=pi)-aŠ-Da-Ta--(and "ascended-up" 1.diš-Yashdata,.. )
(16)--Ardu-ka ù š-ût--(Servant-yours,.. and "who of",.. )
(17)--erēbu itti--(-(always)-"to enter" with,.. )
(18)--ina MÈERIM(=tāhāzu) tāhāzu--(..into BATTLE-War-Battle–!.. ) 
(19)--ù lū nâ[-du ana šâšu ]--(and "may it be" 'to (have)-praise' for him,.. )
(20)--til-la-aṭ(tillu) LUGAL-ri(=ŠÀRru) ENBēlu-ia--(.."warriors"(workers)-(of),. King-Lord-Mine,.. )
(21)--[ ù ] epē[-šu ]--(..and "to treat"... [ .. ])-(lacuna)
(22)--gabbu ina [ ... ]--(..everyone in [ ..?.. ] )-(lacuna)
(23)--LUGAL-ri(=ŠÀRru) ENBēlu-ia--(.., King-Lord-Mine–! .. )
segue:

Reverse

(24)--Ù 1.diš-Sú-Ra-Ta--(But,.. 1.-Surata.. )
(25)--yi(=pi)-il5-qû(leqû) 1.diš-La-aB-A-iYa--(..took Labaya.. )
(26)--ištu URUMa-GID6-Daki--(from Magidda,.. )
(27)--ú yi(=pi)-qabû ana iā-[ ši ](iāši)(--(and "said" to me:— )
(28)--enūma ša GIŠMÁ : (–gl–) a-na-yi--(.."Now 'that by' BOAT :-(gloss) 'ship'... )
(29)--uššuru-šu--(..Send (issue)!..(i.e. Labaya)..)
(30)--ana LUGAL-ri(=ŠÀRru),.. ù (pi)leqû--(to (the) King,.." ..But 'taken'..)
(31)--1.diš-Sú-Ra-Ta ù (pi)tarû--(..(by) 1.-Surata,.. and "returned"-him..)

Cuneiform score, Akkadian, English

Cuneiform score (per CDLI, Chicago Digital Library Initiative), and Akkadian, and English.

<poem>  
Obverse
Paragraph I , (lines 1-7)

1.(P. I of IV) Ša-ni-tam du-ub-bu-ba-ku-mì
___Šanitam, — dabābu
___Furthermore, — I urged
2. _UGU-ŠEŠhi-a_-ia
___ _UGU-ŠEŠhi-a_-ia–!
___(with) Compatriotspl.-mine (my Brothers)–!

Sub-Paragraph
3.Šum-ma-mi yi-pu-šu-mi
___Šumma  epēšu
___QuoteIf (they)bring 
4. _dingir-meš_-nu ša (Šàrru)_Šàr_-ri _EN_-nu
___ilupl.-nu, — ša (Šàrru)_Šàr_-ri _EN_-nu, —
___godspl.-our, — which(are-of) King-Lord-ours, —
5.ù ni-ik-šu-du-um-mi
___u kašādu–!
___and defeat–!
6.1=dišLa-ab-a-ia ù _til-la_nu-um-ma
Note: on Reverse", line 42.:– ma : (–gl–) ha-ia-ma
___1=dišLabaya, — _tillu_-nu-um-ma
___1=dišLabaya, — (equipment)-nu-um-ma  : (–gl–) ha-ia-ma (by boat)(land carriage?)
7.nu-ub-ba-lu-uš-šu a-na (Šàrru)_Šàr_-ri _EN_-nu
___abālu ana (Šàrru)Šàr-ri EN-nu –!
___bring (him alive) to King Lord-ours –!
EndQuote

Paragraph II, (lines 8-23)

8.(P. II of IV) Ù tu-sà-ah-mì : (–gl–) tu-ra
___U tu-sà-ah-mì(tazzimtu) : (–gl–) tu-ra
___But "bad luck"(lamentation) : (–gl–)(the horse was disabled, "shot")
9.x?-pa? _ANŠE-KUR-RA:MUNUS_-ia ù iz-zi-iz-mì
___x?-pa? _ANŠE-KUR-RA:MUNUS_-ia,–  u uzzuzu
___/+-x?-pa?-+/ horse-mine,– and (rode-behind)("stood-behind")
10. _EGIR_-šu : (–gl–) uh-ru-un-ú
___ _EGIR_-šu : (–gl–) harrānu  —!
___behind (troops)-His : (–gl–) expedition-ing —!
11.Ù ir(wrong, =sa) sa-ka-ap-mi
___u sakāpu-mi
___and en-camped-Myself
12.it-ta 1=diš-Ya-aš-da-ta
___itti 1=diš-Ya-aš-da-ta
___with 1Yashdata.

segue
13.Ù a-di ka-ša-di-ia
___U adi kašādu
___But before "conquering"-(in-battle) (("arriving"-(into battle)-))
14.ù da-ku-šu : (–gl–) ma-ah-ṣú-ú
___u dâku-šu, – : (–gl–) mahāṣu, —!
___and "death-us", – : (–gl–) "struck-down", —!
15.ù al lu-ú-mì  1=(diš) Ya-aš-da-ta
___u elû lū 1=(diš)Ya-aš-da-ta
___and ascended, "let-it-be", 1Yashdata, –
16. _ÁRAD_-ka ù šu-ú-te(ut!-no)
___ _ÁRAD_-ka, – u šu-ú-te
___Servant-yours, – but ?straight-away?
17.yi-ru-ub-mi it-ti# [ x ]##
___erēbu-mi, – itti-[ x ]##
___entered-Myself, – with [ them ? ]## 
18.i-na MÈ (me3=tāhāzu) ta-ha#-zi##
___ina (MÈ = tāhāzu) - tāhā#zu##
___into BATTLE, battle
19.ù lu-ú yi-na- -[ -di-nu a-na ša-šu ]
___u lū nâ[du ana šâšu ]
___and "may-it-be" pr[aise for Him ]
20. _til-la-aṭ _ŠÀRRU_-ri# [ _EN_ ]-ia
21.[ ù ] li-pa-aš#-[ ši-ih ]

Bottom

22.gáb-bá i-na [ .... ]
23. _Šàr_-ri _EN_-ia
24.ù 1=dišSú-ra-ta#

Paragraph III-(lines 24-35)
24.(ù 1=dišSú-ra-ta# )___u 1=dišSú-ra-ta#
___and 1SurataReverseParagraph III-(lines 24-35)

25.(P. III of IV) yi-il5-qé-mì 1-diš-La-[ ab-a-ia ]
___laqû 1-diš-La-[ ab-a-ia ]
___took...1Labaya
26.iš-tu _IRI_ Ma-gid6-daki
___ištu _URU_ Me-gid6-daki
___from _city_ Megiddo
27.ù yi-iq-bi a-na ia-a- [ ši ]
___u qabû ana iāši —
___and said to me —
28.QuoteIna-mí ((No))šà-geš-_MÁ_ giš-ru((yes)) : (–gl–) a-na-yi
___Quotei-na-mí _MÁ_ giš-ru : (–gl–) a-na-yi
___QuoteBy boat ....(?by land carriage)29.ú-ta-aš-ša-ru-uš-šu
___uššuru
___(I will) send30.a-na (_lugal_)_Šarru_-ri ù yi-ìl-qé-šu
___ana (_lugal_)_Šarru_-ri,— ù
___to King,—30.5--------------ù yi-ìl-qé-šu
___-----------------u leqû
___-----------------and take31.1=dišSú-ra-ta ù yu-ta-šar-šu
___1=dišSú-ra-ta
___1Surata31.5-------------ù yu-ta-šar-šu
___----------------u uššuru
___----------------and send (Him)32.iš-tu _IRI_ He-na-tu-naki
___ištu _URU_ He-na-tu-naki
___from _city_ Hannathon33.a-na _É_-šu ù 1=dišSú-ra-ta
___ana _É_-šu,EndQuote — ù 1=dišSú-ra-ta
___To _house_hisEndQuote — and 1Surata

segue
33.5-------------ù 1=dišSú-ra-ta
___---------------u 1=dišSú-ra-ta
___---------------and 1Surata
34.la-qí-mi _kù-BABBARhi-a_ ip-țì-ir-ri-šu
___leqû _kù-BABBARhi-a_
___took silver, – returning
34.6-------------ip-țì-ir-ri-šu
___----------------târu
___----------------returning
35.i-na _ŠU_-ti-šu : (–gl–) ba-di-ú
___ina _ŠU_-ti-šu : (–gl–) ba-di-ù
___in "Hand"-his — : (–gl–) ba-di-ù–! (the ransom—!) (the Silver—!)

Paragraph IV-(lines 36-47)

36. (P. IV) Ša-ni-tam, – mi-na-am-mi ep-ša-ku-mì
___Šanitam, — mīnu epēšu
___Furthermore, — what (have I) done
36.3----------mi-na-am-mi ep-ša-ku-mì
___------------- — Mi-na-am-mi ep-ša-ku-mì
___------------- — QuoteWhat (have I) done37.a-na (Šàrru)_Šàr-ri_ _EN_-ia
___ana (Šàrru)_Šàr-ri_ _EN_-ia—?
___to (Šàrru) _King(-ri)_ _Lord_-mine—?38.i-na-mí _sig_-ia : (–gl–) ya-qí-ìl-li-ni
___inuma-(enūma), — _sig_-ia : (–gl–) ya-qí-ìl-li-ni —!
___Now, — (I am) contempted —!39. —  Ù _DUGUD_  : (–gl–) yu-ka-bi-id
___ — U : (–gl–) yu-ka-bi-id (kabta)
___  — But are honored40. _ŠEŠ_HI-A-ia șé-eh-ru-ta5 
___ _ŠEŠ_HI-A-ia,— șehēru, —!
___(compatriots)(Brothers)pl.-mine,— less important, —!EndQuote

segue
41.Ù 1=dišSú-ra-ta
___U 1=dišSú-ra-ta
___But 1Surata
42.yu-ta-šir9
Note: the rest, (majority), of line 42, is the up-side-down cuneiform from Obverse, Line 6nu-um-ma : (–gl–)''' ha-ia-ma

42.yu-ta-šir9
___aṣû
___brought
43.1=dišLa-ab-a-ia ù
___1=dišLa-ab-a-ia ù
___1Labaya
43.7--------------ù
___----------------u
___----------------and
44.yu-ta-šir9-mì 1=diš, diškur-me-her
___aṣû 1=diš, diškur-me-her
___brought 1Ba'al-Mehir
45.a-na _É_-šu-ni
___ana _bītu_-šu, –!
___to _house_-his, –!Sub Paragraph46.Ù lu-ú yi-de-mi
___U, — lū idû, –
___And, — "may-it-be" proclaimed (& recognized), – ("may you know ")
47.(Šàrru)Šàr-ru EN-ia–!
___(Šàrru)Šàr-ru EN-ia–!
___King Lord-mine–!
(End)
  
</poem>

See also
Biridiya
Labaya
Tel Megiddo
Glossenkeil (Amarna letters)
Amarna letters–phrases and quotations

References

Moran, William L. The Amarna Letters. Johns Hopkins University Press, 1987, 1992. (softcover)
 Parpola, 1971. The Standard Babylonian Epic of Gilgamesh, Parpola, Simo, Neo-Assyrian Text Corpus Project, c 1997, Tablet I thru Tablet XII, Index of Names, Sign List, and Glossary-(pp. 119–145), 165 pages.

External links

Photo, EA 245: Obverse
Photo, EA 245: Reverse
Line Drawing, EA 245: Obverse & Reverse, CDLI no. P270957 (Chicago Digital Library Initiative'')
CDLI listing for all EA Amarna letters, 1-382

Amarna letters
Canaan